Landero is a surname.  People with this name include:

 Humberto Gómez Landero (1904–1968), Mexican screenwriter and film director
 José Francisco Landero (b. 1971), Mexican politician
 Leticia López Landero (b. 1962), Mexican politician
 Tomás López Landero (b. 1950), Mexican politician
 Toto Landero (1995–2022), Filipino professional boxer
 Alejandro Landero Gutiérrez (b. 1975), Mexican politician

See also 
 Landeros surname page